Sergei Tabachnikov, also spelled Serge, (in Russian: Сергей Львович Табачников; born in 1956) is a Russian mathematician who works in geometry and dynamical systems. He is currently a Professor of Mathematics at Pennsylvania State University.

Biography 
He earned his Ph.D. from Moscow State University in 1987 under the supervision of Dmitry Fuchs and Anatoly Fomenko.

From 2013 to 2015 Tabachnikov served as Deputy Director of the Institute for Computational and Experimental Research in Mathematics (ICERM) in Providence, Rhode Island. He is now Emeritus Deputy Director of ICERM.

He is a fellow of the American Mathematical Society.  He currently serves as Editor in Chief of the journal Experimental Mathematics.

A paper on the variability hypothesis by Theodore Hill and Tabachnikov was accepted and retracted by The Mathematical Intelligencer and later The New York Journal of Mathematics (NYJM). There was some controversy over the mathematical model, the peer-review process, and the lack of an official retraction notice from the NYJM.

Selected publications

References

External links 

Homepage

Russian mathematicians
Fellows of the American Mathematical Society
1956 births
Living people
Moscow State University alumni
Dynamical systems theorists
Topologists
Russian expatriates in the United States
Pennsylvania State University faculty